Boesmanshoek Pass is a mountain pass situated in the Eastern Cape, on the Regional R397 (Eastern Cape), the road between Molteno, Eastern Cape and Sterkstroom (South Africa)

Mountain passes of the Eastern Cape